Punjab Sports Festival 2012, is a sports festival held in Punjab, Pakistan. It is run by the Government of Punjab. It is a divisional, district, tehsil and union council level festival, inaugurated on February 28, 2012, by Hamza Shahbaz Sharif. It is organised by the Sports Board Punjab in Lahore.

Sports 
These are the sports which will be played in festival.
 Athletics
 Badminton
 Basketball
 Cricket
 Cycling
 Football
 Hockey
 Kabaddi
 Karate
 Marathon
 Taekwondo
 Volleyball
 Weightlifting

References 

Sports competitions in Pakistan
Sport in Punjab, Pakistan
Punjabi festivals
Sports festivals in Pakistan